Abdelkader Ghorab (born February 28, 1998 in Hachem, Algeria) is an Algerian footballer.

On August 9, 2019, Ghorab scored Paradou's first ever goal in African competition in the 3-0 win over CI Kamsar of Guinea in the preliminary round of the 2019–20 CAF Confederation Cup.

References

External links
 

1998 births
Algerian footballers
Algerian Ligue Professionnelle 1 players
Living people
People from Mascara Province
Paradou AC players
Association football forwards
21st-century Algerian people